Yevgeny Katsura (1937 – 1967) was a Russian weightlifter. Between 1962 and 1966 he won one world and two European titles, twice finishing in second place; he also set nine world records: seven in the press and two in the total.

References

1937 births
1967 deaths
Soviet male weightlifters
European Weightlifting Championships medalists
World Weightlifting Championships medalists